Myrmecium may refer to:

 Myrmecium (spider), a genus of ant-like spiders from South America (Castianeirinae)
 Myrmecium (sponge) (Goldfuss), a genus of extinct Calcareous sponges
 Myrmecium (place), a little ancient city near the Bosporus

See also
 Myrmecia (disambiguation)
 Myrmaecium, a genus of fungi